The 1893 Hampden–Sydney football team represented Hampden–Sydney College during the 1893 college football season.

Schedule

References

Hampden–Sydney
Hampden–Sydney Tigers football seasons
College football winless seasons
Hampden–Sydney Tigers football